This is the list of Southeast Asian Games records in weightlifting. Records are maintained in each weight class for the snatch lift, clean and jerk lift, and the total for both lifts.

Current records

Men
♦ denotes a performance that is also a current world record. Statistics are correct as of 24 May 2022.

Women

References 

Southeast Asian Games
Weightlifting in Asia
Weightlifting at the Southeast Asian Games
weightlifting records
weightlifting